Dalip Kaur Tiwana ( 4 May 1935 – 31 January 2020) was one of the foremost novelists and short-story writers of contemporary Punjabi literature. She won awards, both regional and national, and was a widely translated author. She retired as Professor of Punjabi, and Dean, from Punjabi University, Patiala. She is widely credited as a tour-de-force in the creation of the contemporary literature in the Punjabi language.

Biography
Dalip Kaur Tiwana was born on 4 May 1935 in the village of Rabbon in the Ludhiana district of Punjab in a well-to-do land-owning family in British India. She was educated at Patiala, where her uncle, Sardar Sahib Tara Singh Sidhu was Inspector General of Prisons. She had a distinguished academic career. She earned first class honors in the pursuit of her M.A., and then received a PhD degree from the Panjab University, Chandigarh.

In 1963, she joined the Punjabi University, Patiala as a Lecturer and then went on to become Professor and Head of the Department of Punjabi, and Dean, Faculty of Languages. She was also a UGC National Lecturer for a year. She often lectured in England, United States, and Canada where she also received awards for her contributions to the literature.   

She was married to sociologist and Poet and Professor Bhupinder Singh and has a son Dr Simranjit Singh, who is an Assistant Professor of Electronics Engineering at Punjabi University. Dr. Tiwana lived with her family on the campus of Punjabi University, Patiala, where she was life fellow and writer-in-residence.

On 14 October 2015, she renounced her Padma Shri award (the highest honor for an Indian writer bestowed by the country) against increasing 'intolerance' in the country. She received this award in 2004 for her contribution to literature and education.

Collection

Novels
Agni Prikhya
Eho Hamara Jiwna
Waat Hamari 
Teeli da Nishaan 
Sooraj te Samandar 
Doosri Seeta 
Within Without 
Sarkandyaan de Des 
Dhupp Chhaan te Rukh 
Sabh Des Paraya 
Hey Ram 
Lambi Udaari 
Peele Pattyaan di daastan
Hastaakhar 
Pairchaal 
Rin Pittraan da 
Air Wair Mildayaan 
Langh gaye dariya 
Jimi Puchhay Asmaan 
Katha Kuknoos Di 
Duni Suhava Baagh 
Katha Kaho Urvashi 
Bhaujal 
Oh taan pari si 
Moh maaya 
Janam Juye Haarya 
Khada Pukare Pattani 
Paunaan di jind meri 
Khitij ton paar 
Teen lok se nyari 
Tumri katha kahi na jaye 
Vichre Sabho Vaari Vaari 
Takhat Hazara Door Kude

Stories
Merian saariyaan kahaniyaan 
Kise da Munda
Saadhna 
Yaatra Na Kro Corona hega
Ik kudi 
Tera Kamra mera kamra 
Panjaan Vich Prmeshar
Fullan Dian Kahaniyaan 
Panchhiyaan Dian Kahaniyaan 
Baabaniyaan Kahaniyaan 
Putt Saputt Karen 
Paidaan 
Kaale Likh Na Lekh 
Athhe Pehar
Rab Te Ruttan
Vedna (1958)
Yatra 
Tera kamra mera kamra 
Pira (1965)
Malan
Merian saariyan kahaniyaan (1995)

Autobiography
Nange Pairaan da safar 
Poochte ho to suno 
Turdyaan Turdyaan

Essays
Tere mere sarokaar 
Jeeun joge

English Translations
Such is her fate (Punjabi University) 
A journey on bare feet (Orient Longman) 
Twilight+Mark of the nosepin (NBT, Delhi) 
Gone are the rivers (Macmillan) 
The tale of the phoenix (Unistar, Chandigarh) 
Who am I (Diamond Pocket Books, Delhi) 
Tell the tale Urvashi (Orient Blackswan).
Who Am I? ( trans. Dr. Rajinder Singh) Who am I is the story of a young and educated married woman, who feels suffocated in her monotonous life and chooses to renounce the world for self-realization. She follows a group of sadhus and sadhvis to Hardwar, but from there moves on alone in her quest for truth.

The characters in Tiwana's novels and short-stories are the downtrodden and the innocent rural folk with suppressed desires and passions. Tragedy and irony mark the main elements of her fiction. Complex inner duality of the female psyche is the chief theme of Tiwana. Besides her achievement in fiction, Tiwana has also written two books on literary criticism.

Awards
Academic
 Honored with UGC National Lecturership.
Literary
 Govt. of Punjab Award for Sadhana as the best book of short stories, 1960–61.
 Woman of the year - American biographical institute, USA, 1955
 Sahitya Akademi Award in 1971 for novel Eho Hamara Jeevna (This our life, 1969)
 Ministry of Education and Social Welfare Award for Punjaan Vich Parmeshar in 1975
 Nanak Singh Puruskar (Languages Department, Govt. of Punjab) for the novel Peele Patian Di Dastan
 Gurmukh Singh Musafir Award (Languages Department, Govt. of Punjab) for the autobiography Nange Pairan Da Safar in 1982
 Canadian International Association of Punjabi Authors and Artists Award, 1985.
 Shiromani Sahitkar Award, Languages Department, Govt. of Punjab, 1987.
 Pramaan Pattar from Punjab Govt. 1989.
 Dhaliwal Award from Punjabi Sahit Academy, Ludhiana, 1991.
 Best Novelist of the Decade (1980–90), Punjabi Academy, Delhi, 1993. 
 Nanjanagudu Thirumalamba Award for the novel Katha Kuknus Di, Karnataka, 1994
 Vagdevi Award for the novel Duni Suhava Bagh from Bhartiya Bhasha Parishad, Calcutta, 1998 
 Honored with Mata Sahib Kaur Award during the tercentenary celebrations of the Birth of the Khalsa for outstanding contribution in the field of language, art and literature at Anandpur Sahib on 11 April 1999.
 Kartar Singh Dhaliwal Award (Lifetime achievement) from Punjabi Sahit Academy, Ludhiana, 2000
 Saraswati Samman in 2001 for novel Katha Kaho Urvashi
 Padma Shri Award in 2004 for Literature & Education
 Panj Pani Award from Jalandhar Doordarshan, 2005.
 Punjabi Sahit Rattan Award from Govt. of Punjab, 2008.
 Honorary D.Litt. from Guru Nanak Dev University, Amritsar, 2011.

See also

List of Punjabi authors
List of Punjabi language poets

References

External links
All Books of Dalip Kaur Tiwana

1935 births
2020 deaths
Recipients of the Saraswati Samman Award
Recipients of the Sahitya Akademi Award in Punjabi
Recipients of the Padma Shri in literature & education
Novelists from Punjab, India
Sikh writers
Punjabi-language writers
Indian women academics
Indian women novelists
People from Ludhiana district
Academic staff of Punjabi University
Punjabi people
20th-century Indian novelists
20th-century Indian short story writers
Indian women short story writers
Women writers from Punjab, India
20th-century Indian women writers